Abel Manta (12 October 1888 in Gouveia – 9 August 1982 in Lisbon) was an architect, painter, designer, and Portuguese cartoonist.

Between 1904 and 1916 attended the school of Fine Arts, completed the course in painting, having won the third Prize of the National Society of Fine Arts.

In 1919 he went to Paris participating in the "Salon de la Société Nationale" among other galleries, having also attended the course of engraving with William Schlumberger. While there he met his wife, the Portuguese artist Clementina Carneiro de Moura.

He made several trips to study in Europe.

References

External links 
  Abel Manta work 

1888 births
1982 deaths
People from Gouveia, Portugal
Portuguese architects
20th-century Portuguese painters
20th-century male artists
Portuguese male painters